Kingsthorpe College (KC), formerly Kingsthorpe Community College and before that Kingsthorpe Upper School, is a secondary school with academy status in Kingsthorpe, Northamptonshire. In 2012 it became a member of the Collaborative Academies Trust. It has about 1,200 students with c.180 in the sixth form. The school moved into a new building in 2007. It has been a specialist sports college with a second specialism in History since 2006.  

In September 2021 Kingsthorpe College joined the Orbis Education Trust, a Multi-Academy Trust, which also includes Southfield School in Kettering.

The school is set on one site, which is located on Boughton Green Road. It was previously on two sites, the other being next to Welford Road, which is on the A5199. The college is a 'sports college', after changing from a Language College and a former ICT College.

Ofsted judgements
In 2013 Ofsted said the school required improvement. In 2015 and again in 2019 it was judged Good.

Notable alumni
 Ben Cohen, rugby player
 Gian Sammarco, actor
 Marc Warren, actor
Callum Robinson, footballer

References

Secondary schools in West Northamptonshire District
Academies in West Northamptonshire District